Jonathan David Cohen (born October 5, 1955) is an American psychologist and cognitive neuroscientist. He is the Robert Bendheim and Lynn Bendheim Thoman Professor in Neuroscience and Professor of Psychology at Princeton University, where he is also the founding co-director of the Princeton Neuroscience Institute. He originally joined the faculty of Princeton in 1998, and became the founding director of the Center for the Study of Brain, Mind, and Behavior in 2000. A noted expert on neuroimaging, he played a major role in increasing the use of fMRI scanners in scientific research. He has been a fellow of the Association for Psychological Science since 2007 and of the American Association for the Advancement of Science since 2012. He is a recipient of the Joseph Zubin Memorial Fund Award, the APA Award for Distinguished Scientific Contributions to Psychology, and the Association for Psychological Science's William James Fellow Award.

References

External links
Home page
Faculty page at the Princeton Neuroscience Institute

Living people
1955 births
American cognitive neuroscientists
Princeton University faculty
Yale University alumni
Fellows of the Association for Psychological Science
Fellows of the American Association for the Advancement of Science
University of Pennsylvania alumni
Carnegie Mellon University alumni
Scientists from New York City
Neuroimaging researchers